"Grimm Job" is the tenth episode of the twelfth season of the animated comedy series Family Guy and the 220th episode overall. It originally aired on Fox in the United States and Canada on January 12, 2014, and was directed by Joe Vaux and written by Alec Sulkin.

In the episode, Peter reads Stewie three fairy tales: Jack and the Beanstalk, Little Red Riding Hood and Cinderella.

Plot
When Lois sends Peter in to check on Stewie who is having trouble sleeping, he sits down to read Stewie some fairy tales.

Jack and the Beanstalk
Jack (played by Peter) is sent out by his wife (played by Lois) to sell their cow (played by Brian) for money to buy food. Despite her warnings not to buy magic beans, he crosses paths with a troll (played by Mort) who trades him magic beans for the cow. The wife is displeased (even though Jack said if he buys some, it's her fault for mentioning them) and throws them outside, and demands that Jack get a real job. That night, the beans grow into a giant beanstalk. Jack decides to climb it and discovers a castle in the clouds. There, he finds The Goose That Lays the Golden Eggs (played by Stewie), but wakes up the Giant (played by Chris), and ignorantly makes him follow him. Jack chooses to run away and flees down the beanstalk where Rumpelforeskin (played by Quagmire) is sawing it down for blocking his view of Little Miss Muffet's tuffet (he needs to see her tuffet to make curds and whey), though he couldn't get help from the off-screen Little Boy Brown (played by Cleveland) since he can't find his gloves. Jack reaches the ground and the beanstalk falls which kills the giant. With the goose in their possession, their financial troubles are solved but their sexual troubles are still very much a problem.

Little Red Riding Hood
Little Red Riding Hood (played by Stewie) is given a basket of food from her mother (played by Lois) to take to Grandma (played by Barbara Pewterschmidt) and, after complaining about why Grandma would need a 'Coors Party Ball' sets out through the forest. After a brief encounter with a laking tree which calls him out for acting gay, "she" runs into the Big Bad Wolf (played by Brian) as they discuss the “Three Little Pigs” as Red goes to her grandma's house. At Grandma's house, Little Red Riding Hood's grandfather (played by Carter Pewterschmidt) heads out to the Old Woman in the Shoe's house to get the Old Woman (played by Consuela) to tidy up in there or he will rent her house to Goldilocks and the Three Bears (the three bears are actually depicted as three gay men). The Big Bad Wolf gets there first and tricks Grandma into letting him into the house and eating her. After starting to go through the charade that the Big Bad Wolf is really Grandma, Red can no longer keep it up and the Big Bad Wolf agrees. Although he wonders why she's upset when he is aware that he's about to be slaughtered by the woodsman (played by Peter),  he chooses that moment to burst through the door and violently bisect the wolf with a chainsaw exposing the remains of Grandma before rushing onto the next house. Red wonders if he was really the hero or just a lunatic going from house to house randomly killing people; screams are then heard from off-screen, indicating that the woodsman has killed another victim and Red says they should call somebody.

Cinderella
In the same storyline as the Disney film, Cinderella (played by Lois) is forced to work for her mean stepsisters (played by Meg and Stewie) when a message arrives with an invitation to a ball by Prince Charming (played by Peter). Cinderella arrives, ready to go to the ball with her stepfamily, but her stepsisters tear the dress at the urging of her stepmother (played by Barbara Pewterschmidt). Her fairy godmother (played by Mayor West) arrives and grants her a new dress and carriage (made from the medieval version of Joe Swanson) to go to the ball as well as turning the dog (played by Brian) into a horse to pull the carriage. At the ball, Prince Charming meets the evil stepsisters and rejects their advances but falls for Cinderella. After they dance and start to kiss, the clock strikes midnight and Cinderella is forced to flee losing her glass slipper on the way out. The next day, Prince Charming orders the Captain of the Guards (played by Seamus) to send out his men to search for the girl whose foot will fit the slipper. After failed attempts at the houses of different women (two of which were played by Angela and Tricia Takanawa), Prince Charming arrive at Cinderella's house. Before Prince Charming can try the glass slipper on the stepsisters, he meets Cinderella as his dream girl and they were married until they separated seven months later in order to renew their relationship.

Finale
Stewie falls asleep as Peter tucks him in and says goodnight to him. Peter also says goodnight to Chris (unaware that Herbert is in his room) and goodnight to Meg (unaware that she has hanged herself).

Reception
Eric Thurm of The A.V. Club gave the episode a C−, saying ""Grimm Job” has just enough time to run through the basic beats of each story, doing the most superficial possible version of a Family Guy fairy tale. Not only does that reduce the quality of many of the jokes, it also reduces the room in the episode for cutaways (I counted only two), which sure are random but are also often an opportunity for the writers to shove in random stuff they think is funny. Without cutaways, Family Guy just has to rely on the story, which has never really been its strong suit." He also noted that the Stewie and Brian (Red Riding Hood) segment was "the funniest of the night."

The episode received a 2.7 rating and was watched by a total of 5.22 million people. This made it the most watched show on Animation Domination that night, beating American Dad!, Bob's Burgers and The Simpsons.

References

External links
 

Family Guy (season 12) episodes
2014 American television episodes
Brothers Grimm
Television about fairies and sprites
Television episodes about suicide
Works based on Cinderella
Works based on Jack and the Beanstalk
Works based on Little Red Riding Hood